I Wanna Be A Model (我要做Model) is a reality show hosted by Dylan Liong and Lynn Lim, which aims to find the next top fashion model in Malaysia.

The series featured a cast of 20 contestants (10 male models and 10 female models) will compete with each other to become the ultimate male and female supermodel. The participants will have to outshine each other on the catwalk fashion shows, photo shoots, self-make up and self-styling assignments and in video clip shoots.

Among with the prize was: a one-year modeling contract with Andrews Models, a one-year membership with Celebrity Fitness, a brand new Proton Savvy, a gift from Revlon cosmetics, a brand new Swatch watches, and a brand new Motorola mobile phones.

The winners is Jack Koo, winning over Caster Wenorica Chong & Eloise Law & Ken Tan.

Contestants

Judges
Steve Yap
Jasmine Koh
Christopher Low

Elimination chart

 Note: Contestant who wins the challenge receives extra five frames for the week's photo shoot.

 Male Contestant
 Female Contestant
 Green background with the word WINNER means the contestant won the competition
 Orange background with the word LOW means the contestant was part of the bottom
 Red background with the word OUT means the contestant was eliminated from the competition

Photo Shoot Guide

 Episode 1 Photo shoot: Promotional
 Episode 2 Photo shoot: Promotional
 Episode 3 Photo shoot: Nude look
 Episode 4 Photo shoot: Mirror
 Episode 5 Photo shoot: Hip hop
 Episode 6 Photo shoot: Runway
 Episode 7 Photo shoot: Funky
 Episode 8 Photo shoot: Horoscope
 Episode 9 Photo shoot: Wild animal
 Episode 10 Photo shoot: High Fashion
 Episode 11 Photo shoot: My Wedding
 Episode 12 Photo shoot: TV Commercial for Proton Savvy

External link

I Wanna Be A Model
2006 Malaysian television seasons